Athens High School is a public high school located in Troy, Michigan, USA. It is attended by nearly 1,700 students, serving grades 9-12. Athens is one of four high schools in the Troy School District, along with Troy High School, Niles Community High School and International Academy. Athens High School opened in 1974. The principal is Lara Dixon.

Academics

Athens High School is accredited by the North Central Association of Colleges and Secondary Schools. The curriculum includes 27 advanced placement (AP) courses from which to choose. There are many academic clubs and events.

Athletics
In 2010, Athens offered 13 varsity sports teams for boys and 13 varsity sports teams for girls. These sports include baseball, basketball, competitive cheerleading, cross-country skiing, American football, golf, gymnastics, ice hockey, lacrosse, association football, softball, swimming, tennis, track and field, volleyball, water polo, and scholastic wrestling. Athens plays in one of the top competitive leagues in the State of Michigan, the Oakland Activities Association (OAA), with 27 other member schools of the league, all under the regulation of the Michigan High School Athletic Association (MHSAA).

Commendations
Athens is a National and Michigan Exemplary School and has been named one of the best high schools (ranked 881st in the 2019 ranking) in the United States by US News.

Athens Theater Company has been nominated by USA Weekend for National Recognition in the HSM Showstopper contest, for its performance of Disney's High School Musical in spring 2008.

Notable alumni
 Martin Klebba, actor, known from Pirates of the Caribbean films
 Ivana Miličević, film and television actress
 Tomo Miličević, musician and guitarist of Thirty Seconds to Mars
 Bridget Regan, musician, Flogging Molly
 Robin Sloan, author of Mr. Penumbra’s 24-Hour Bookstore
 Ryan Stegman, artist for Marvel Comics' Venom, The Superior Spider-Man, Uncanny Avengers, Scarlet Spider, Inhuman, and The Amazing Spider-Man
 Jason Dungjen, 1998 winter olympics pairs figure skater

References

External links

 Official Athens High School website
 Official Troy School District website

Public high schools in Michigan
Schools in Troy, Michigan
Educational institutions established in 1974
High schools in Oakland County, Michigan
1974 establishments in Michigan